This is a list of members of the Australian Senate from 1999 to 2002. Half of the state senators had been elected at the March 1996 election and had terms due to finish on 30 June 2002; the other half of the state senators were elected at the October 1998 election and had terms due to finish on 30 June 2005. The territory senators were elected at the October 1998 election and their terms ended at the next federal election, which was November 2001.

Notes

References

Members of Australian parliaments by term
21st-century Australian politicians
20th-century Australian politicians
Australian Senate lists